The 2000–01 season was PAOK Football Club’s 75th in existence and the club’s 43rd consecutive season in the top flight of Greek football. The team will enter the Greek Football Cup in the First round and will also enter in UEFA Cup  starting from the First round.

Players

Squad

Transfers

Players transferred in

Players transferred out

Pre-season

Competitions

Overview

Alpha Ethniki

League table

Results summary

Results by round

Matches

Greek Cup

First round

Group 4

Matches 

Note: For first time were established double matches in the phase of groups, thus each team played 10 matches. Because the phase began very early, in a period that teams should play preparation friendlies, the Hellenic Football Federation (EPO) allowed at the 5 first matches a maximum of 7 substitutions, something unusual in Greece, very probably and internationally, for matches of an official competition.

Second round

Quarter-finals

Semi-finals

Final

UEFA Cup

First round

Second round

Third round

Statistics

Squad statistics

! colspan="13" style="background:#DCDCDC; text-align:center" | Goalkeepers
|-

! colspan="13" style="background:#DCDCDC; text-align:center" | Defenders
|-

	

! colspan="13" style="background:#DCDCDC; text-align:center" | Midfielders
|-

! colspan="13" style="background:#DCDCDC; text-align:center" | Forwards
|-

	

|}

Source: Match reports in competitive matches, uefa.com, epo.gr,  rsssf.com

Goalscorers

Source: Match reports in competitive matches, uefa.com, epo.gr,  rsssf.com

References

PAOK FC seasons
PAOK